The Quarterly Journal of Engineering Geology & Hydrogeology is a quarterly peer-reviewed  scientific journal published by the Geological Society of London. The journal covers engineering geology and hydrogeology, including civil engineering, mining practice, and water resources. Coverage includes topics from other disciplines related to this journal's focus such as applied geophysics, environmental geology, contaminated land, waste management, land-use planning, geotechnics, rock mechanics, geomaterials, and geological hazards.

Abstracting and indexing
This journal is abstracted and indexed by the Science Citation Index, Current Contents/Engineering, Computing & Technology, and the Chemical Abstracts Service/CASSI.

External links
 
 Alternate website at GeoScience World

Publications established in 1967
Engineering journals
Quarterly journals
Geology journals
Geological Society of London academic journals
Mining journals
English-language journals